Wolhuter is an Afrikaans surname. Notable people with the surname include:

 Deirdre Wolhuter, South African actress
 Jeff Wolhuter (born 1981), South African cricket umpire
 Kade Wolhuter (born 2001), South African rugby union player

Afrikaans-language surnames